Binny's Beverage Depot  is a  family business liquor store chain in Illinois originally founded in 1948. 

The company operates forty five retail locations,  including seven in Chicago, thirty three in the surrounding area, and one each in Champaign, Springfield, Peoria, Bloomington, and Rockford.  

The privately held company was founded in 1948 by Harold Binstein as Gold Standard Liquors at Clark and Sheffield, one block south of Wrigley Field.   

Michael Binstein is the current CEO of Binny's Beverage Depot, having taken over following his father's death in August 1995.

References

External links

Alcohol distribution retailers
Wine retailers
Retail companies established in 1948
Beer in Illinois